Pisoniviricetes is a class of positive-strand RNA viruses which infect eukaryotes.  A characteristic of the group is a conserved 3C-like protease from the PA clan of proteases for processing the translated polyprotein. The name of the group is a portmanteau of member orders "picornavirales, sobelivirales, nidovirales" and -viricetes which is the suffix for a virus class.

Orders
The following orders are recognized:

 Nidovirales
 Picornavirales
 Sobelivirales

References

Viruses